Corps colours, or troop-function colours (ge: Waffenfarben) were traditionally worn in the German armed forces, the Wehrmacht, from 1935 until 1945, to distinguish between several branches, special services, corps, rank groups and appointments of the ministerial area, general staff, Oberkommando der Wehrmacht, down to the military branches Heer, Luftwaffe and Kriegsmarine. The corps colour was part of the uniform piping, gorget patches, shoulder straps, arabesque and lampasse ornaments of general and flag officers. It was also part of the heraldic flags, colours, standards and guidons.

In the Luftwaffe, there was a strictly defined system of corps colours for collar patches, piping and coloured edging around the shoulder boards or straps. The chevrons on special clothes for Luftwaffe soldiers, e.g. flight suits and jumpsuits, also showed corps colours.

Colors and examples 
The table below contains some corps colors and examples used by the Heer from 1935-45.

Exceptions & special cases
Special regulations applied to corps colours of units, services, and special troops, attached permanently to the ground services of the Heer.

 Division Hermann Göring: Kragenspiegel and shoulder strap piping (Schulterklappenvorstoß) "white", collar patches´ piping (Kragenspiegelvotstoß) in corps colours:
 white (with black border line): infantry,
 scarlet: artillery and anti aircraft defence (Flugabwehr)
 golden-brown: communications
 black: engineer
 rose-pink: armor, antitank (Panzer jäger) and armored reconnaissance (Panzeraufklärer).
 Air Force divisions: Collar patch main colour: green piping to collar patches and shoulder straps in corps colours:
 yellow: cyclists (Radfahrer) and reconnaissance (Aufklärer),
 rose-pink: antitank troops (Panzerjäger)
 scarlet: artillery and anti aircraft defence (Flugabwehr)
 bright-blue: Supply (Nachschubtruppe) and Administration (Verwaltungstruppe)
 golden-brown: communications

See also main articles
 Corps colour
 Corps colours (Waffen-SS)
 Corps colours of the German Army (1935–1945)
 Ranks and insignia of the Luftwaffe (1935–1945)
 World War II German Army ranks and insignia

References

 Glossary of German military terms
 Adolf Schlicht, John R. Angolia: Die deutsche Wehrmacht, Uniformierung und Ausrüstung 1933-1945Vol. 1: Das Heer, Motorbuch Verlag, Stuttgart 1992Vol. 3: Die Luftwaffe, Motorbuch Verlag, Stuttgart 1999(very detailed information and discussion but no coloured images)
 Corps colours of the Wehrmacht according to the order of the Oberkommandos der Wehrmacht from October 14, 1942, here a selection only.

German military uniforms
Military insignia